Paul J Brindley (born 1954) is an Australian parasitologist, microbiologist, and helminthologist. He is professor of Microbiology, Immunology, and Tropical Medicine at the George Washington University.

Education & Career

Paul Brindley received a doctorate from the University of Queensland, Brisbane, Australia and completed postdoctoral training at the NIAID's Laboratory of Parasitic Diseases, National Institutes of Health, Bethesda, Maryland.

He has held faculty level appointments at the QIMR Berghofer Medical Research Institute, Brisbane, Australia, University College Dublin, Ireland, and Tulane University, New Orleans, Louisiana, where he was the William Vincent Professor of Tropical Medicine. He was the recipient of the Scholar Award in Molecular Parasitology, Infectious Diseases Research of the Burroughs Wellcome Fund (2001-2006), and is a Fellow of the American Society of Tropical Medicine and Hygiene. He is co-Editor-in-Chief of PLOS Neglected Tropical Diseases.

His current research focuses on neglected tropical diseases (NTDs) and NTD associated cancers. He is pursuing functional genomics and other approaches to characterize new disease interventions. Brindley and co-investigators reported the activity of CRISPR-Cas programmed editing of the human blood fluke, Schistosoma mansoni and the human liver fluke, Opisthorchis viverrini.

In December 2019, he was awarded by Khon Kaen University, Thailand a Doctorate of Science, honoris causa.

References

1954 births
Cancer researchers
Living people
Australian parasitologists
George Washington University School of Medicine & Health Sciences faculty
Australian medical researchers
University of Queensland alumni